Toni Prostran (born April 9, 1991) is a Croatian professional basketball player, currently playing for Iserlohn Kangaroos in the third-tier German Pro-B League. Standing at 1.83 m, he plays at the point guard position.

Professional career 
After passing through the KK Zadar youth squads, Prostran made his debut for the senior team in December 2007. Not satisfied with the opportunities he got at Zadar, he moved to KK Zagreb, in January 2010. Expecting to move his career to another level, Prostran was disappointed at his new club, and he choose to break up his contract, and move back to KK Zadar, in the summer of 2012. After a more successful 2012–13 season (3.7 points, 1.9 rebounds, and 2.3 assists per game in the Adriatic league), in the summer of 2013, he renewed his contract with KK Zadar.

In June 2014, Prostran agreed to a one-year deal with the Swedish league finalists Norrköping Dolphins. He averaged 16.5 points, 2.9 rebounds, and 6.5 assists per game, and he was selected to the eurobasket.com website's All Swedish league first team, and was also named the league's best Bosman player of the year by eurobasket.com. In the summer of 2015, he moved to another Swedish club, LF Basket Norrbotten. He averaged 15.8 points, 3.2 rebounds, and 7.7 assists per game (the most assists per game in the league), and he was once again named by the website eurobasket.com, to the All Swedish League first team, and as the league's best Bosman player of the year.

In October 2020, Prostran moved to Iserlohn Kangaroos playing in the third-tier German Pro-B League. He also took the position of the club's U16 team coach.

National team career 
Prostran played with the Croatian junior national teams. His very successful youth career started at the 2007 European U-16 Championship, where he took the title of top scorer, and was chosen to the All-tournament team. In 2008, he was a part of the Croatian team that won the bronze medal at the European U-18 Championship. His second bronze medal came a year later, at the 2009 World U-19 Cup. Prostran was selected to the All-Tournament Team, as he also was a few weeks later at the 2009 European U-18 Championship, where he took the top scorer and assists titles as well.

References

External links
 Toni Prostran at aba-liga.com
 Toni Prostran at fibaeurope.com
 Toni Prostran at draftexpress.com

1991 births
Living people
ABA League players
BC Nevėžis players
Croatian expatriate sportspeople in Lithuania
Croatian men's basketball players
FC Porto basketball players
Jämtland Basket players
KK Zadar players
KK Zagreb players
Kolossos Rodou B.C. players
Norrköping Dolphins players
Point guards
Basketball players from Zadar